The Rural Municipality of Marquis No. 191 is a rural municipality (RM) in the Canadian province of Saskatchewan within Census Division No. 7 and  Division No. 2. It is located in the south-central portion of the province.

History 
The RM of Marquis No. 191 incorporated as a rural municipality on December 11, 1911.

Geography

Communities and localities 
The following urban municipalities are surrounded by the RM.

Villages
 Keeler
 Marquis

The following unincorporated communities are within the RM.

Organized hamlets
 Parkview

Localities
 South Lake
 Sun Valley 
 Tuxford

Demographics 

Government 
The RM of Marquis No. 191 is governed by an elected municipal council and an appointed administrator that meets on the second Tuesday of every month. The reeve of the RM is Kenneth Waldenberger while its administrator is Samantha Millard. The RM's office is located in Marquis.

Gallery

References 

M